Moisés San Nicolás Schellens (born 17 September 1993) is an Andorran footballer who plays as a centre back, right back or right midfielder for Atlètic Club d'Escaldes in the Primera Divisió.

References

External links
 
 

1993 births
Living people
People from Andorra la Vella
Andorran people of Belgian descent
Andorran footballers
Andorra international footballers
Andorra youth international footballers
Association football defenders
FC Andorra players
FC Ordino players